Kēōkea is an unincorporated populated place in Hawaii County, Hawaii, United States. Satellite imagery shows evidence of a humid climate with agriculture dominant around the settlement. Just to the north is the area of Hōnaunau. It was the name for the land division (ahupuaa) of ancient Hawaii that stretched from the shoreline to Mauna Loa owned by Mataio Kekūanāoa.

The name is used for several places throughout the Hawaiian Islands.
In the Hawaiian Language, kē ō kea means "the sound of whitecaps", or "the white sand".

References

Unincorporated communities in Hawaii County, Hawaii
Populated places on Hawaii (island)
Unincorporated communities in Hawaii